Nidderdale, historically also known as Netherdale, is one of the Yorkshire Dales (although outside the Yorkshire Dales National Park) in North Yorkshire, England. It is the upper valley of the River Nidd, which flows south underground and then along the dale, forming several reservoirs including the Gouthwaite Reservoir, before turning east and eventually joining the River Ouse.

The only town in the dale is Pateley Bridge.  Other settlements include Wath, Ramsgill, Lofthouse, and Middlesmoor above Pateley Bridge, and Bewerley, Glasshouses, Summerbridge, Dacre, Darley, Birstwith, Hampsthwaite and Kettlesing below Pateley.

Area of Outstanding Natural Beauty 

Nidderdale was designated an Area of Outstanding Natural Beauty in 1994.  The AONB covers a much wider area than Nidderdale.  In addition to Nidderdale itself (above Hampsthwaite), the AONB includes part of lower Wharfedale, the Washburn valley and part of lower Wensleydale, including Jervaulx Abbey and the side valleys west of the River Ure. The highest point in the Nidderdale AONB is Great Whernside, 704 metres above sea level, on the border with the Yorkshire Dales National Park.

The AONB Web site provides directions for popular walks and offers information on canoeing and kayaking, caving, climbing, cycling, fishing and horse riding.

Local government 
Nidderdale was historically in the West Riding of Yorkshire, and in the Lower Division of Claro Wapentake.  In the 19th century local government reforms most of the dale fell within the Pateley Bridge Poor Law Union, later the Pateley Bridge Rural Sanitary District and from 1894 Pateley Bridge Rural District. In 1937 the rural district was merged to become part of Ripon and Pateley Bridge Rural District.  Hampsthwaite and Felliscliffe in the lower dale fell within Knaresborough Poor Law Union, later Knaresborough Rural Sanitary District and from 1894 Knaresborough Rural District, which merged in 1938 to become part of Nidderdale Rural District.

Since 1974 the whole dale has fallen within the Borough of Harrogate in North Yorkshire.

Transport
A Nidderdale Omnibus started operating on 1 August 1849 and ran between Pateley Bridge and Ripley Station.  In 1862 the North Eastern Railway opened the Nidd Valley Railway from Nidd Valley Junction near Harrogate to Pateley Bridge.  Between 1907 and 1937 the Nidd Valley Light Railway served the dale above Pateley Bridge. The Pateley Bridge branch closed in 1964.

Nidderdale is now served by the buses of Harrogate Bus Company.

In 2020, the AONB Web site provided these specifics. The area can be reached by bus "from Harrogate to Pateley Bridge; The Transdev Harrogate & District number 24 service runs regularly from Harrogate to Pateley Bridge. Nidderdale is also well served by DalesBus services". The nearest train station is at Harrogate. Highway access is via "A1(M) and the A61 to the east, and the A65, A59, M65 and M62 to the south".

Filming location
All Creatures Great and Small (2020 TV series) was filmed mostly in the Yorkshire Dales with many of the Dales scenes filmed in Wharfedale and Nidderdale. For example, the crossroads that are so important in the Christmas episode are "on the roads above Pateley Bridge" in Nidderdale.

References

External links

Visit Nidderdale
Nidderdale Inns and Pubs
 Visitors' guide to Nidderdale
 Nidderdale Area of Outstanding Natural Beauty
 Churches of Nidderdale

 
Valleys of North Yorkshire